Minuscule 2062 (in the Gregory-Aland numbering), Oα42 (von Soden), is a Greek minuscule manuscript of the New Testament, on 29 paper leaves (34.4 by 25.5 cm). Palaeographically it has been assigned to the 13th century.

Description 

The codex contains the text of the Book of Revelation with a commentary of Oecumenius on that book (together 159 leaves). Book of Revelation is on the end of this codex (pages 131–159).

The text is written in one column per page, in 46 lines per page.

The Greek text of the codex is a representative of the Alexandrian text-type, though codex is not old its text has high value, comparable with Minuscule 2053. Aland placed it in Category I.
It was not examined by the Claremont Profile Method.

The codex currently is housed at the Vatican Library (Vat. Gr. 1426), in Rome.

See also 
 List of New Testament minuscules
 Biblical manuscript
 Textual criticism

References

Further reading 

 Herman C. Hoskier, "Concerning the Text of the Apocalypse" 1 (London, 1929), pp. 524–527.

Greek New Testament minuscules
13th-century biblical manuscripts